Hibernia is a community in the Canadian province of Nova Scotia, located in the Region of Queens Municipality . Residency is almost exclusively seasonal cottage use. The Nova Scotia Guides Association operates the Twin Lakes Campground on the Hibernia Road between First and Second Christopher Lakes.

References
Hibernia on Destination Nova Scotia

Communities in the Region of Queens Municipality
General Service Areas in Nova Scotia